Daniel Andújar Ponce (born 14 May 1994) is a Spanish middle-distance runner specialising in 800 metres. He represented his country at the 2014 and 2016 World Indoor Championships.

Competition record

Personal bests
Outdoor
400 metres – 46.87 (Toledo 2016)
800 metres – 1:45.17 (Madrid 2017)
Indoor
400 metres – 47.91 (Antequera 2014)
800 metres – 1:47.16 (Sabadell 2017)

References

External links

1994 births
Living people
Spanish male middle-distance runners
People from Alicante
Athletes (track and field) at the 2016 Summer Olympics
Olympic athletes of Spain
World Athletics Championships athletes for Spain
Athletes (track and field) at the 2018 Mediterranean Games
Mediterranean Games competitors for Spain
21st-century Spanish people